The DBAG Class 490 is a three-car dual-voltage electric multiple unit train for the Hamburg S-Bahn. It was manufactured jointly by Bombardier Transportation and Alstom in 2013.

Design 
A single unit consists of 3 cars with the outer two having cabs. Trains can operate on the 1200 V side contact third rail and 15 kV overhead wires. It is currently the only train on the Hamburg S-Bahn to have air conditioning.

External links

 

Electric multiple units of Germany
Hamburg S-Bahn
15 kV AC multiple units
Bombardier Transportation multiple units
Alstom multiple units